Youm Jung-hwan (1 December 1985 – 18 February 2014) was a South Korean cyclist. He died at the age of 28 from a heart attack.

Major results
2005
 1st Time trial, Asian Cycling Championships
2007
 1st  Time trial, National Road Championships
2008
 1st  Time trial, National Road Championships
2011
 National Road Championships
2nd Time trial
3rd Road race
2012
 1st  Time trial, National Road Championships

References

External links

1985 births
2014 deaths
South Korean male cyclists
Cyclists at the 2006 Asian Games
Asian Games competitors for South Korea